Itolia is a genus of robber flies in the family Asilidae. There are about five described species in Itolia.

Species
These five species belong to the genus Itolia:
 Itolia atripes Wilcox, 1949 i c g
 Itolia fascia Martin, 1966 c g
 Itolia maculata Wilcox, 1936 i c g b
 Itolia pilosa Martin, 1966 c g
 Itolia timberlakei Wilcox, 1949 i c g
Data sources: i = ITIS, c = Catalogue of Life, g = GBIF, b = Bugguide.net

References

Further reading

 
 
 

Asilidae genera
Articles created by Qbugbot